Mohammed Dauda (born 20 February 1998), commonly known as Mo Dauda, is a Ghanaian professional footballer who currently plays as a forward for Segunda División club Tenerife, on loan from Anderlecht.

Club career
On 31 August 2021, Dauda moved on loan from Anderlecht to FC Cartagena in the Spanish Segunda División.

On 22 July 2022, Anderlecht announced that they had loaned Dauda to Spanish Segunda División side CD Tenerife for the 2022-23 season.

References

External links

1998 births
Living people
Ghanaian footballers
Ghana under-20 international footballers
Asante Kotoko S.C. players
R.S.C. Anderlecht players
SBV Vitesse players
Esbjerg fB players
FC Cartagena footballers
CD Tenerife players
Belgian Pro League players
Eredivisie players
Association football midfielders
Ghanaian expatriate footballers
Ghanaian expatriate sportspeople in Belgium
Expatriate footballers in Belgium
Ghanaian expatriate sportspeople in the Netherlands
Expatriate footballers in the Netherlands
Ghanaian expatriate sportspeople in Denmark
Ghanaian expatriate sportspeople in Spain
Expatriate men's footballers in Denmark
Expatriate footballers in Spain